Leonard Badger (8 June 194520 May 2021) was an English footballer who played as a right-back. He spent the majority of his career at Sheffield United before moving on to a shorter spell at Chesterfield where he finished his career.

Early life
Badger was born in the Darnall area of Sheffield on 8 June 1945.  He played school football for both Sheffield Boys and England Schoolboys.  He progressed through the junior ranks at Sheffield United and signed his first professional contract in August 1962.

Professional career

Sheffield United
Badger made his league debut for the Blades first team against Leyton Orient at Bramall Lane on 26 April 1963.  By the end of the 1963–64 season he established himself as first choice at right-back, replacing club stalwart Cec Coldwell and remained a regular there until 1975. He was appointed captain in 1968 by manager John Harris. This made him the youngest league captain in United history, and one of the youngest skippers in the league at the time. He served as captain for two years before relinquishing the role to Eddie Colquhoun. Badger's left-back colleagues of the early and mid-sixties included Graham Shaw and Bernard Shaw, but it was the arrival of Ted Hemsley in 1968 that provided him with his most fruitful partnership which continued through one of United's most successful post war periods from 1969–1972.

Badger's attacking instincts, along with those of Hemsley, showed well as United narrowly failed to win promotion in the 1969–70 season. Badger was an ever present in the Division Two promotion winning side of the 1970–71 season.  Although he did not score a goal in that particular season, he was best remembered for buccaneering runs, crosses from the right-wing and for his occasional thunderous shot from 25 yards or more.

In his time with United Badger made 458 league appearances with seven goals.

Chesterfield
Badger left Bramall Lane soon after the arrival of new Blades manager Jimmy Sirrel, being sold to Chesterfield on 1 January 1976. He played for a further two seasons for the Spireites making 46 appearances before a series of knee injuries ended his career.

International career
Badger played seven times for England Youths, thirteen times for England U23s and for the Football League side. He faced competition for a place on the England team from George Cohen and Keith Newton.

Later life
After retiring from football, Badger became a publican in the Chesterfield area.  He also served as a matchday host with Sheffield United.

Badger died on 20 May 2021.  He was 75, and had undergone a complicated surgical procedure.

Career statistics

References

1945 births
2021 deaths
Footballers from Sheffield
Association football fullbacks
England youth international footballers
England under-23 international footballers
English Football League players
Sheffield United F.C. players
Chesterfield F.C. players
English Football League representative players
English footballers
People from Darnall